Here If You Listen is an album by David Crosby and his collaborators Michael League, Becca Stevens, and Michelle Willis, who perform on tour together backing Crosby as The Lighthouse Band, and was released on October 26, 2018 by BMG Music.

Content 
The Lighthouse Band originated on Crosby's Lighthouse album. Producer Michael League along with Becca Stevens  and Michelle Willis provided backing vocals on the Crosby-Stevens song "By the Light of Common Day". On this album, the band is very different. AllMusic reviewer Stephen Thomas Erlewine wrote, "Chalk that up to the Lighthouse Band interacting like a band here, collaborating on the writing and trading off lead vocals as they glide into lush, shimmering harmonies." Seven of the eleven tracks were written by all four members, with another penned by the quartet plus Snarky Puppy keyboard player Bill Laurance. One tune is by Stevens and Jane Tyson Clement, and another is by Willis. Only Joni Mitchell's "Woodstock" is not a Lighthouse Band composition.

Track listing

Personnel 
 David Crosby – vocals, acoustic guitar (1, 3, 5, 7, 8, 11)
 Michael League – vocals, acoustic guitar (1, 3–5, 9), Minimoog bass (1, 2, 5, 9), electric bass (1–3, 5, 7, 8, 10, 11), 12-string acoustic guitar (3, 7), ARP Omni (4, 6), electric guitar (5), fretless baritone electric guitar (5), baritone acoustic guitar (11)
 Becca Stevens – vocals, Hammertone electric guitar (1, 5, 8, 9), 7-string electric guitar (2), ukulele (4), acoustic guitar (6, 9, 11), electric guitar (6), charango (10)
 Michelle Willis – vocals, Fender Rhodes (1–3, 5, 6, 8, 9), ARP Omni (2, 6), pump organ (2, 4, 9), organ (5, 10), Rhodes bass (5, 9), Wurlitzer electric piano (10), acoustic piano (11)
 Bill Laurance – acoustic piano (4)

Production
 Michael League – producer 
 David Crosby – co-producer, liner notes
 Becca Stevens – co-producer
 Michelle Willis – co-producer
 Fab Dupont – co-producer, engineer, mixing
 Josh Welshman – additional engineer 
 Tom Beuchel – assistant engineer 
 John Muller – assistant engineer 
 Joey Wunsch – assistant engineer 
 Greg Calbi – mastering 
 Emilia Canas Mendes – artwork
 Gili Dailes – photography 
 Stella K. – photography
 Jeffrey Parrish – photography
 Mike Chadwick – management
 Mastered at Sterling Sound (New York, NY).

References

2018 albums
David Crosby albums
Bertelsmann Music Group albums